Cristina Randall (born ) is a Canadian-born Mexican entrepreneur profiled in 100 Women (BBC). She co-founded Conekta.

References 

1980s births
Living people
Canadian expatriates in Mexico
Canadian women in business
21st-century Mexican businesswomen
21st-century Mexican businesspeople
BBC 100 Women
Place of birth missing (living people)